The High Energy and Particle Physics Prize, established in 1989, is awarded every two years by the European Physical Society (EPS) for an outstanding contribution to high energy and particle physics. :)
Enjoy

Recipients 
Source:

 1989 Georges Charpak
 1991 Nicola Cabibbo
 1993 Martinus Veltman
 1995 Paul Söding, Bjørn Wiik, Sau Lan Wu
 1997 Robert Brout, François Englert, Peter Higgs
 1999 Gerard ’t Hooft
 2001 Don Perkins
 2003 David Gross, David Politzer, Frank Wilczek
 2005  and the NA31 Collaboration
 2007 Makoto Kobayashi, Toshihide Maskawa
 2009 The Gargamelle collaboration
 2011 Sheldon Glashow, John Iliopoulos, Luciano Maiani
 2013 The ATLAS and CMS collaborations, Michel Della Negra, Peter Jenni, Tejinder Virdee
 2015 James D. Bjorken, Guido Altarelli, Lev Lipatov, Giorgio Parisi
 2019 The CDF and D0 collaborations
 2021 Torbjörn Sjöstrand, Bryan Webber

See also

 List of physics awards

References

Awards of the European Physical Society
Physics awards